Gilles Veissière (born September 18, 1959 in Nice) is a football referee from France, best known for supervising two matches during the 2002 FIFA World Cup in South Korea and Japan. He also led two matches at the 2000 and 2004 UEFA European Football Championship, and has refereed numerous UEFA Champions League matches. He was selected for the FIFA Europe vs. Rest of the World match to accompany the World Cup draw in Marseille in 1997.

Veissière is known to have served as a FIFA referee during the period from 1994 to 2004. He also officiated in numerous other international competitions, including the 1997 FIFA World Youth Championship, qualifying matches for the 1998, 2002, and 2006 World Cups, and qualifying matches for Euro 1996, Euro 2000, and Euro 2004.

References

External links
 Profile

1959 births
Living people
French football referees
UEFA Champions League referees
FIFA World Cup referees
2002 FIFA World Cup referees
UEFA Euro 2000 referees
UEFA Euro 2004 referees